The Tessier Lake is a freshwater body located on the south side of the southwestern part of the Gouin Reservoir, in the territory of the town of La Tuque, in the region of Mauricie, in the province of Quebec, in Canada.

This lake straddles the townships of Faucher (southern part) and Achintre (northern part).

Recreotourism activities are the main economic activity of the sector. Forestry comes second.

The Forest Road R1009 passes on the west side of Mattawa Bay serving the lower Flapjack River, passing in the northern part of Tessier Lake and the southern part of Bureau Lake (Gouin Reservoir). This R1009 road joins the Southeast route 404 which serves the northern part of the Canadian National Railway.

The surface of Tessier Lake is usually frozen from mid-November to the end of April, however safe ice circulation is generally from early December to the end of March.

Geography

Toponymy
The term "Tessier" is a family name of French origin.

The toponym "Lac Tessier" was formalized on December 5, 1968, by the Commission de toponymie du Québec, when it was created.

Notes and references

See also 

Lakes of Mauricie
La Tuque, Quebec